NGC 4709 is an elliptical galaxy located in the constellation Centaurus. It is considered to be a member of the Centaurus Cluster and is the dominant member of a small group of galaxies known as "Cen 45" which is currently merging with the main Centaurus Cluster (Cen 30) even though the two subclusters' line of sight redshift velocities differ by about 1500 km/s.  NGC 4709 was discovered by astronomer James Dunlop on May 7, 1826.

Distance estimates

See also 
 List of NGC objects (4001–5000)
 NGC 4696

References

External links

Centaurus (constellation)
Elliptical galaxies
4709 
43423 
Centaurus Cluster
Astronomical objects discovered in 1826